The Message Send Protocol (MSP) is an application layer protocol used to send a short message between nodes on a network. The original version of the protocol was published in 1990. It was updated as Message Send Protocol 2 in 1992.

TCP-based service
One message send service is defined as a connection-based application on TCP.  A service listens for TCP connections on port 18.  Once a connection is established, a short message is transmitted from the sender to the receiver over the connection. The sender closes the connection after sending the message.

UDP-based service
Another message send service is defined as a datagram-based application on UDP.  A service listens for UDP datagrams on port 18.  When a datagram is received by the receiver, an answering datagram is sent back to the sender containing exactly the same data.

See also 
 LAN Messenger
 List of TCP and UDP port numbers
 SMTP

References

Internet protocols
Application layer protocols
LAN messengers